

Commander Carlyon Wilfroy Bellairs (15 March 1871 – 22 August 1955) was a British Royal Navy officer and politician.

Bellairs was born at Gibraltar, the son of Lieutenant-General Sir William Bellairs, KCMG, and Blanche St. John Bellairs.

He was a Lieutenant of the Royal Navy, and was placed on the retired list 15 March 1902.

In the 1906 general election he was elected to Parliament for King's Lynn as a Liberal, but in October 1906 crossed the floor to sit as a Liberal Unionist.
In the January 1910 general election he unsuccessfully stood for election at West Salford and in December 1910 was also defeated at Walthamstow.

In 1911 Bellairs was married to Charlotte, daughter of Colonel H. L. Pierson of Long Island, USA.
From 1913 he was a member of the London County Council as Municipal Reform Party member for Lewisham, resigning on 17 April 1915.

He returned to Parliament as Conservative member for Maidstone at a by-election in February 1915, and was re-elected for the Maidstone division of Kent in 1918.
He retired from Parliament at the 1931 general election, having declined a baronetcy in 1927.

Charlotte Bellairs died in 1939. Carlyon Bellairs lived at 10 Eaton Place, London and Gore Court, Maidstone, Kent, and was a member of the Carlton Club and the Coefficients dining club of social reformers set up in 1902 by the Fabian campaigners Sidney and Beatrice Webb. He died in Barbados in 1955 aged 84.

Works

References

 Michael Stenton and Stephen Lees, Who's Who of British Members of Parliament Volume III 1919-1945, Harvester Press, 1979, p. 26

Further reading

External links

 
 
 

1871 births
1955 deaths
Conservative Party (UK) MPs for English constituencies
Graduates of the Royal Naval College, Greenwich
Liberal Party (UK) MPs for English constituencies
Royal Navy officers
UK MPs 1906–1910
UK MPs 1910–1918
UK MPs 1918–1922
UK MPs 1922–1923
UK MPs 1923–1924
UK MPs 1924–1929
UK MPs 1929–1931
Members of London County Council
Liberal Unionist Party MPs for English constituencies